The family Sphingidae comprises the "hawk-moths", of which seventeen occur regularly in Great Britain:

Subfamily Sphinginae

 [Agrius cingulata, pink-spotted hawk-moth — probable import]
 Agrius convolvuli, convolvulus hawk-moth — migrant
 Acherontia atropos, death's-head hawk-moth — migrant
 [Manduca quinquemaculata, five-spotted hawk-moth — probable import]
 [Manduca sexta, tomato sphinx — probable import]
 [Manduca rustica, rustic sphinx — probable import]
 Sphinx ligustri, privet hawk-moth — south
 [Sphinx drupiferarum, wild cherry sphinx — possible migrant, more likely import]
 Hyloicus pinastri, pine hawk-moth — south and south-east (localized)

Subfamily Smerinthinae 

 Mimas tiliae, lime hawk-moth — south and centre
 Smerinthus ocellata, eyed hawk-moth — south and centre
 Laothoe populi, poplar hawk-moth — throughout

Subfamily Macroglossinae 

 Hemaris tityus, narrow-bordered bee hawkmoth — south-west, west-central, north-west and east (Nationally Scarce B) ‡
 Hemaris fuciformis, broad-bordered bee hawkmoth — south and east-central (Nationally Scarce B)
 Macroglossum stellatarum, hummingbird hawk-moth — common migrant, resident in south-west
 Proserpinus proserpina, willowherb hawk-moth — south and east (may be accidental import)
 Daphnis nerii, oleander hawk-moth — migrant
 Hyles euphorbiae, spurge hawk-moth — migrant
 Hyles gallii, bedstraw hawk-moth — migrant (occasionally over-winters)
 [Hyles nicaea, Mediterranean hawk-moth — possible migrant, more likely import]
 [Hyles hippophaes, seathorn hawk-moth — possible migrant, more likely import]
 Hyles livornica, striped hawk-moth — migrant
 Hyles lineata, white-lined hawk-moth — ?vagrant
 Deilephila elpenor, elephant hawk-moth — south and centre (common), north (rare)
 Deilephila porcellus, small elephant hawk-moth — south, centre and north (localized)
 Hippotion celerio, silver-striped hawk-moth — migrant

Species listed in the 2007 UK Biodiversity Action Plan (BAP) are indicated by a double-dagger symbol (‡)—species so listed for research purposes only are also indicated with an asterisk (‡*).

See also
List of moths of Great Britain (overview)
Family lists: Hepialidae, Cossidae, Zygaenidae, Limacodidae, Sesiidae, Lasiocampidae, Saturniidae, Endromidae, Drepanidae, Thyatiridae, Geometridae, Sphingidae, Notodontidae, Thaumetopoeidae, Lymantriidae, Arctiidae, Ctenuchidae, Nolidae, Noctuidae and Micromoths

References 

 Waring, Paul, Martin Townsend and Richard Lewington (2003) Field Guide to the Moths of Great Britain and Ireland. British Wildlife Publishing, Hook, UK. .

Moths
Britain
Moths